Hogna lenta is a species of wolf spider in the family Lycosidae. It is found in the USA.

Diet 
Hogna lenta eats mostly small insects, such as crickets, waxworms, and mealworms. If individuals cannot find any of these, they will eat beetles and other smaller insects. When they are newly emerged from an egg sac, they eat small fruit flies, and each other.
The species is a ground spider, making burrows in the dirt. They lay web tripwires on top of their burrow. When something walks over the web, the spider feels it. They slowly uncover themselves, stalking their prey, before finally pouncing on them. They have a neurotoxin that they inject into the insect through their fangs. It paralyzes the insect immediately while the spider drinks the hemolymph from the insect.

Natural defenses 

Hogna lenta is naturally equipped with a venom powerful enough to paralyze a small insect. This venom should pose no threat to a healthy adult human, only feeling like a bee sting. They generally raise their front legs in the air when threatened, to look bigger. If this does not work, they will lunge right in front of their attacker to startle them. Their last defense is biting the attacker. Due to their sheer size, most animals would not try to attack them. Their diameter is about the same as a 50-cent coin.

Habitat 
They primarily live in dense shrubbery and forests. They make small but intricate burrows, infusing the soil with webs. Despite some people's beliefs, they very rarely stray into people's houses. They will, however, wander into camping tents, seeing all the mosquitos there. They have been spotted in Florida and many other southern states.

Lifestyle 
Shortly after mating (maybe 1–2 weeks), the female constructs a large white egg sac bigger than its abdomen containing many eggs. They  carry the egg sac on the spinnerets on their abdomen. Spiderlings grow slowly inside the eggs for 5–8 weeks, before finally hatching. When emerged from an egg sac, they are hardly visible, about the size of a small LED light. They stay on the mother's abdomen for about 1–4 weeks. When ready, they climb off and run off into the wild. When small, they are extremely agile, making them hard to catch. Many of the young spiders die off within a few days of leaving the mother's back. If they live a few weeks, they molt. This is a process of shedding their old skin. Spiders molt their old skin, as their new skin is malleable. They grow while the new skin is soft, than repeat the process. Young spiders can molt up to 3 times a month.

References

 Bradley, Richard A. (2012). Common Spiders of North America. University of California Press.
 Ubick, Darrell (2005). Spiders of North America: An Identification Manual. American Arachnological Society.

Lycosidae
Spiders described in 1844